Ningbo High School is a high school offering education from a junior-high to senior-high level in Ningbo, Zhejiang province, China. Founded in 1898, Ningbo High School is among the best provincial high schools. It has been acknowledged as the first modernized government-run boarding high school in Ningbo. It is a modern experimental school in education technology and one of the hundred provincial schools emphasizing science and research.

The junior part of Ningbo Middle School was departed from Ningbo Middle School in the spring 2000 due to complicated political reasons. The departed junior school was then named as XingNing Junior school. Though being literally independent from the old Ningbo High School, XingNing school still shares most of its faculties and facilities with the Ningbo High School

Facts and figures
 Location: Higher educational park, south of Ningbo City, Zhejiang Province, China
 Size: 18.9 hectares of campus with a built area of more than 60,000 square meters
 Equipment: Well-equipped under the criteria for national model high schools
 Current principal: Ms. Shao Yingchun 邵迎春
 Goals: To shape first-rate management, to cultivate star teachers while pursuing top teaching quality, and to promote the school's renowned image.

School motto
 Self-discipline
 Self-reliance 
 Self-improvement 
 Carrying out self-awareness, scientific spirit and humanitarian accomplishments

Renowned graduates

More than 50,000 students have graduated since 1898, a few well-known include:

Members of Chinese Academy of Science and Chinese Academy of Engineering

 Feng Ding (冯定, 1921)
 Yan Kai (严恺, 1929)
 Ren Mei'e  (任美锷, 1929)
 Shi Zhongci (石钟慈, 1951)
 Wang Yangyuan (王阳元, 1953)
 He Xianshi (贺贤土, 1957)
 Yu Songlie (余松烈, 1935)
 Zhuang Hui (庄辉)

Notable alumni

 Hua Shaofeng (华少峰, 1924-1925), president of Shandong University
 Sha Menghai (1919), artist
 Sha Wenhan (1923), president of Zhejiang Province, China
 Sha Wenwei (沙文威, 1922), VP of political association of P.R. China
 Zhou Yao (周尧, 1920s), professor in entomology
 Wang Zhongshu (1940), archaeologist
 Fu Xuanzong (傅璇琮, 1951), president of Zhonghua Publishing
 Zhu Miaolong (1961), president of Qingdao University
 Zhang Heqi (张和祺, 1954), president of CAS (Chinese Academy of Science) astronomical observatory
 Ni Tianzeng (倪天增, 1956), VP of Shanghai, China 
 Shen Zulun (1947), president of Zhejiang Province, China
 Chen Bulei (陈布雷, 1906), politician
 Zhang Qiyun (1919), historian, geographer, educator, politician
 He Yujie (何育杰, 1898), physicist
 Tu Youyou (屠呦呦, 1920) medical scientist, pharmaceutical chemist, educator, winner of 2015 Nobel prize in physiology or medicine

References

External links
School website

Education in Ningbo
Educational institutions established in 1898
High schools in Zhejiang
1898 establishments in China
Buildings and structures in Ningbo
Junior secondary schools in China